The women's mass start race of the 2013–14 ISU Speed Skating World Cup 5, arranged in Eisstadion Inzell, in Inzell, Germany, was held on 8 March 2014.

Claudia Pechstein of Germany won the race, while Janneke Ensing of the Netherlands came second, and Irene Schouten of the Netherlands came third.

Results
The race took place on Sunday, 9 March, scheduled in the afternoon session, at 15:36.

References

Women mass start
5